John Wood (1790–1856) was a British civil servant who was chairman of the United Board of Stamps and Taxes from 1833 to 1838 and subsequently the first chairman of the Board of Inland Revenue in 1849. In 2012, H.M. Revenue and Customs, successors to Inland Revenue, transferred a collection of revenue dies to the philatelic collections of the British Library that included Wood's personal embossing die. Official correspondence relating to Wood is held in the British National Archives.

References 

1790 births
1856 deaths
19th-century British civil servants
Revenue stamps
HM Revenue and Customs
Chairmen of the Board of Inland Revenue
Philately of the United Kingdom